Asomatos is a village located in the Limassol District of Cyprus, 7 km west of Limassol directly adjacent to the Akrotiti Sovereign Base Area, and lying partly within the British Overseas Territory of Akrotiri and Dhekelia. The village was slightly populated by Turkish Cypriots before 1974.

References

Communities in Limassol District
Turkish Cypriot villages depopulated after the 1974 Turkish invasion of Cyprus